Oddworld: Munch's Oddysee is a 2001 video game, released for the Xbox. It is the third game made by Oddworld Inhabitants, the second chapter of the  Oddworld Quintology, following Abe's Oddysee, and the third overall Oddworld game.

Originally announced as a title in development for PlayStation 2, it was instead released exclusively as one of the launch titles for Xbox. While an "Oddboxx" containing the first four Oddworld games was originally intended for a holiday season 2009 release on Steam, the fourth game in the series was not released until December 20, 2010 on Steam, over two years after the first three. The game received generally positive critical reviews around the time of game's release. Though retrospective and reviews of the game's ports has been more mixed to negative.

Synopsis

Characters
Munch's Oddysee features a selection of new species: the Vykkers, who act as researchers and conduct immoral experiments on other species; the Gabbits, a frog-like species that has been nearly driven to extinction thanks to Glukkons harvesting them; and the Fuzzles, a puffball-like species that the Vykkers frequently experiment on, causing them to be highly aggressive. The game's main protagonist and narrator is Munch, a Gabbit who is captured at the beginning, but subsequently breaks free thanks to a device that grants him new powers. While his story focuses on him rescuing Fuzzles and the last eggs of his species, the game is also joined by the Mudokon hero Abe, who assists in this task in order to find the eggs of unborn Mudokon being held by the Glukkons. The main antagonists of the game include the Vykkers researcher Humphrey, his colleague Irwin, and the Glukkon queen Lady Margaret, both of whom seek to stop the duo while achieving their own goals.

Plot
Following the destruction of RuptureFarms and SoulStorm Brewery, the Glukkons commercially harvest the froglike Gabbits nearly to extinction, harvesting them for their eggs, to create a caviar-based delicacy called "Gabbiar", and their lungs, needed to replace their own because of their excessive chain-smoking habit. Munch, the last surviving Gabbit, is captured and brought to Vykkers Labs, a floating research fortress, where the Vykkers prepare to convert him into a slave to find animals for them, to allow them more time for their research. After having an electronic device attached to his head for that purpose, Munch finds he can use it to help break free captured Fuzzles, who help him to break free from his own confinement. At the same time, the Mudokon hero Abe is instructed by the "Almighty Raisin", an ancient oracular creature, to find and rescue Munch upon learning of his predicament. Abe reaches the Lab, just as Munch manages to escape via a waste chute, and work together to return to the Raisin.

Upon returning to see him, the Raisin reveals that both need to work together to get back into Vykkers Labs, where Abe can find the eggs of unborn Mudokons that he needs to save. Although not willing to return, Munch learns that the only way to save his species from extinction is to recover the last can of Gabbiar in existence, which is due to be auctioned in the Labs. The duo discover that the only way to infiltrate the Labs and the auction is to assist a lazy Glukkon named Lulu, who desires to achieve a fortune from other Glukkons and elevate himself to the highest social rank amongst his species. To assist in this, the duo track down and force various wealthy Glukkons to donate their money to Lulu's accounts, swiftly making him a multi-millionaire. Lulu then heads to Vykkers Labs to bask in his new-found fame and wealth, to which Abe and Munch use the opportunity to break into the Labs. What happens next depends on the overall level of Quarma the player has attained by this point

If the player fails to rescue enough Fuzzles and Mudokon scrubs, attaining less than 50% Quarma, the duo find themselves ambushed by the Fuzzles, who turn on them for not rescuing their kind from the Vykkers. As a result, Abe is killed and has his head displayed as a trophy, while Munch is killed by the Vykkers while extracting his lungs for the Glukkon queen, Lady Margaret. If the player achieves the level of "Black Quarma" (10% Quarma), it's revealed additionally that the Gabbiar has been eaten and the Mudokon eggs have hatched into a new labor force.

If the player has saved a reasonable number of Fuzzles and Mudokons scrubs, attaining 50% Quarma or more, the duo begin working to rescue the eggs of the Mudokons before the auction is to take place, sending them to a transport commandeered by Abe's fellow Mudokons. Eventually, the duo manipulate Lulu to attend the auction and take part in it, with Abe managing to maintain control on him long enough to win the auction. In the resulting chaos, the duo rescue the can of Gabbiar and escape from the Labs. On the ship, As the duo leave across the skies, Abe and Munch watch as Vykkers Labs are destroyed by explosives planted within by the Fuzzles, and witness a second moon in the sky baring the footprint of the Gabbits on its face. If the player achieves the rank of "Angelic Quarma" (90% Quarma), it is revealed that in the aftermath of the destruction of Vykkers Labs, and the liberation of the Mudokon scrubs, Fuzzles and Mudokon eggs, the industrial economy is thrown into disarray with stock prices falling exponentially, and Lulu -who has been reduced to begging following his bankruptcy from winning the auction- is blamed for it.

Gameplay 

Munch's Oddysee was the first game in the Oddworld series in 3D, unlike the 2D Abe's Oddysee and Abe's Exoddus.

Abe's chant possession ability (enabling the player to control NPCs) was also changed: in Munch's Oddysee, it appears as a small ball of energy which the player controls, and must be earned by the collection of the spherical 'spooceshrubs', which may also be used for opening some locked doors. Other new features include Abe's ability to pick up objects and people, and different vending machines, which supply new abilities for a brief moment. The most significant new feature is the ability to switch control between Abe and Munch. Munch has his own abilities, such as using his sonar to control the Snoozers from the control panel, as well as pick up grabbers. He can also swim in water, while Abe can not. In the game's booklet, it warns that Abe can only possess Industrialists, but in gameplay, the player can possess all the creatures permitted in Oddworld: Abe's Exoddus, and, for the first time, Slogs (the reptilian hounds kept by the industrialists as guards), though the options for controlling non-Industrialists are very limited, and usually result in the victim's destruction.

Development

Oddworld Inhabitants' Lorne Lanning's original vision was to create a series of five video games, the Oddworld Quintology, with each game introducing a new hero who would join the existing band of revolutionaries on their journey to put an end to the exploitation of cultures, people and the natural world by profiteering capitalists. Munch's Oddysee is the true second Quintology title. In 1998, after the release of Abe's Exoddus, work started on Oddworld: Munch's Oddysee in earnest. The gameplay moved from 2D to 3D, the platform from PlayStation 2 to Xbox, the publisher from GT Interactive (taken over by Infogrames) to Microsoft in October 2000. Microsoft wanted to market the game to casual game players and proposed that the game be called Abe & Munch's Fun Adventures.

Release

Game Boy Advance version
Oddworld: Munch's Oddysee was ported to the Game Boy Advance in 2003. It was developed by Art Co., Ltd and published by THQ. It is a top-down 2D Platformer and the third and currently last Oddworld game made for a handheld console. This port is more family-friendly, with no gore and profanity. The Story was also changed to be much simpler compared to the console counterpart,

PS3 Port 

An upgraded port of Munch's Oddysee was announced in April 2011 for release on PlayStation 3, developed by the team at Just Add Water. The game was released on the PlayStation Network and include enhanced 720p visuals, more detailed character models, remastered dialogue, and bonus material. Just Add Water later confirmed that both Oddworld Munch's Oddysee and Stranger's Wrath would be released on the PlayStation Vita. On November 30, 2011, a LittleBigPlanet 2 costume of Munch was released on the PlayStation Store. The game was released on December 19, 2012 in Europe, and on December 24 in North America.

Ports 
On February 25, 2016, Oddworld Inhabitants announced a public beta for a re-working port for the PC version of Oddworld: Munch's Oddysee. The port made by Square One has released on macOS, iOS, tvOS and Android. This is for the Steam version for Microsoft Windows. The new port will clear up all bugs that the original version had. A port for the Nintendo Switch was also released on May 14, 2020.

Reception

Oddworld: Munch's Oddysee received fair to positive reviews from critics upon its release in 2001. More critical of the title, GameSpot gave the game a 7.9, stating "Oddworld: Munch's Oddysee is a very smart game with great puzzles, yet there's not enough variety in those puzzles to keep it completely entertaining throughout.". IGN gave the game a 7.4, saying "The final product comes off as anything but polished, and suffers from a lack of variety, and an overabundance of repetition that keeps this game from truly shining like I wished it would. As much as I like the characters and the design of the new Munch game, I'm still hoping for the true spiritual sequel to my good old Abe."

Next Generation reviewed the Xbox version of the game, rating it four stars out of five, and stated that "Munch isn't a typical platformer, but it's still completely entertaining, unique, and highly recommended."

The Academy of Interactive Arts & Sciences awarded Munch's Oddysee its 2001 "Outstanding Achievement in Animation" prize. It was a nominee in the Academy's "Innovation in Console Gaming" and "Outstanding Achievement in Art Direction" categories, but these went to Pikmin and Ico, respectively.

Nominee, Readers' Choice – Best Xbox Story of 2001 Xbox IGN, 2002
Nominee, Readers' Choice – Best Xbox Graphics of 2001 Xbox IGN, 2002
Nominee, Readers' Choice – Best Xbox Sound of 2001 Xbox IGN, 2002
No.1, Best Characters – PLAY, 2002
Xbox Elite Award for Excellence – Official Xbox Magazine, 2002
Best in Show Xbox Games, E3 2001 – Edge, 2002
Best Xbox Game – E3 2002 Review Electronic Gaming Monthly, 2002

Retrospective, Port reviews 
Retrospectives and reviews of ports of the game have been more mixed to negative, with some critics considering it to be the worst game in the Oddworld series. In a 2020 review of the Nintendo Switch version, Nintendo Life remarked that the game was the worst in the Oddworld series and criticized the level design, control, and the unpolished feeling of the game. COGconnected in 2020 review of the Switch praised the game's options and pick-up and play feel, though criticized the "repetitive" puzzle design. God is a Geek also criticized the game's camera, control, environments which they labeled as "bland" in a 2020 review of the Switch port. The Switch port were also criticized for not updating the game's control options and for keeping bugs that were present in the Xbox version in the game.

The Switch and Vita ports of the game that were released in 2020 and 2014 has a Metacritic score of 58 and 72 retrospectively indicating "generally mixed reviews."

Notes

References

External links

2001 video games
Infogrames games
THQ games
3D platform games
Android (operating system) games
Cancelled PlayStation 2 games
Eco-terrorism in fiction
Game Boy Advance games
Interactive Achievement Award winners
IOS games
MacOS games
Microsoft games
Nintendo Switch games
Oddworld
Ouya games
PlayStation 3 games
PlayStation Network games
PlayStation Vita games
Video games scored by Tommy Tallarico
Video games developed in Japan
Video games developed in the United Kingdom
Windows games
Video games about slavery
Xbox games
Video games with alternate endings
Single-player video games
Gamebryo games
Video games developed in the United States